Nirupam is an Indian masculine given name. The name  generally means "without comparison", "incomparable", or "unique", and is of Indian origin.  People with the name Nirupam are usually Hindu by religion.

Notable people 
 Nirupam Bajpai, Indian economist
 Nirupam Sen (diplomat), Indian diplomat
 Nirupam Sen (cricketer), Indian  cricketer
 Nirupam Sen (politician), Indian politician
 Nirupam Sen Chowdhary, Indian  cricketer
 Sanjay Nirupam, Indian politician

References

Indian masculine given names
Hindu given names